The Pentax K-70 is a 24 megapixel compact APS-C digital SLR camera announced by Ricoh on June 8, 2016. In contrast to the previously introduced APS-C flagship K-3 II, it includes a flash, flip-out display and built-in WiFi. In common with that camera, the K-70 is capable of Pixel Shift Resolution images, which provide higher colour resolution and require the camera to be stationary. It is the first Pentax camera to also include on-sensor PDAF elements that support hybrid autofocus, enabling continuous autofocus during video capture.

Like its predecessors K-50 and K-S2, the Pentax K-70 is weather-sealed. Its price level and general features identify it as an upper entry level camera. In contrast to the flagship model, it lacks the second display and second memory card slot. It also uses a lower-specified imaging chip, the PRIME MII, but combines it with "a newly developed accelerator unit". As a Pentax APS-C first, a sensitivity of ISO 102,400 is available, and as a Pentax entry-level first, the camera features 14 bit sensor read-out.

References
https://www.dpreview.com/products/pentax/slrs/pentax_k70/specifications

K-70
Live-preview digital cameras
Cameras introduced in 2016
Pentax K-mount cameras